The Lichfield by-election was a Parliamentary by-election held on 26 February 1896. The constituency returned one Member of Parliament (MP) to the House of Commons of the United Kingdom, elected by the first past the post voting system.

Fulford's election in 1895 was voided on petition on 19 December 1895 and a by-election ensued.

Result

References

1896 elections in the United Kingdom
1896 in England
19th century in Staffordshire
Politics of Lichfield
By-elections to the Parliament of the United Kingdom in Staffordshire constituencies
December 1895 events